James Edward Knowle Schofield (born 1 November 1978 in Blackpool, Lancashire) is an English cricketer. Schofield is a right-handed batsman and a right-arm fast-medium bowler.

Schofield made his Hampshire debut in 2001 against the touring Australia national cricket team, taking a wicket with his ball in First-class cricket. Schofield was released by Hampshire at the end of the 2002 season having made a total of four First-class appearances and one List-A appearance.

Schofield made a return to cricket for a small village side of Easton and Martyr Worthy.

References

External links
James Schofield on Cricinfo
James Schofield on CricketArchive

1978 births
Living people
English cricketers
Hampshire cricketers
Sportspeople from Blackpool